James Card (October 25, 1915 – January 16, 2000) was an American film preservationist who established the motion picture collection at George Eastman House, one of the major moving image archives in the United States.

In November 1948, Card joined the staff of the newly created George Eastman House with the initial title of "assistant to the curator", who was Beaumont Newhall. In 1955, Card discovered Louise Brooks living as a recluse in New York City and persuaded her to move to Rochester, New York, to be near the George Eastman House. From the museum's inception until his retirement in 1977, Card built the collection and gave it an international identity.

Notes

References
"James Card; Telluride Film Festival Co-Founder", Los Angeles Times, January 21, 2000.

Slide, Anthony (2000). Nitrate Won't Wait: A History of Film Preservation in the United States. Jefferson, NC: McFarland. .

1915 births
2000 deaths
American archivists
American art historians
Film curators
George Eastman House people
Writers from Shaker Heights, Ohio
Case Western Reserve University alumni
20th-century American historians
20th-century American male writers
American male non-fiction writers
Historians from Ohio